I Don't Know How She Does It is a 2011 American comedy film based on Allison Pearson's 2002 novel of the same name. Directed by Douglas McGrath, the film stars Sarah Jessica Parker, Pierce Brosnan and Greg Kinnear.

The film was released on September 16, 2011, and received generally negative reviews from critics. It was also a box office bomb, only grossing $31.4 million worldwide on a $24 million budget.

Plot 
Kate (Sarah Jessica Parker) receives a reminder from her daughter, Emily's (Emma Rayne Lyle) kindergarten bake sale. Kate buys a store-baked pie and a glass pie holder. Back home, she is greeted by her husband, Richard (Greg Kinnear). Kate and Richard attempt to have sex, but she falls asleep due to exhaustion. In the middle of the night, Kate goes to check on her children. The next morning, she is greeted with a hug by her 2-year-old son, Ben (Theodore and Julius Goldberg). Kate pleads for Richard to stay home as the babysitter, Paula, is not there to take over.

Kate meets her friend, Allison (Christina Hendricks), a single mother working as a lawyer. They later encounter "the Momsters" – Wendy Best (Busy Philipps) and Janine LoPietro (Sarah Shahi), who are both stay-at-home mothers. At work, Kate's boss, Clark Cooper (Kelsey Grammer) assigns a new project with Jack Abelhammer (Pierce Brosnan) to Kate. In the morning as Kate leaves her house with her children calling out to her, she cries from guilt towards her children. Later, Kate arrives in New York City and meets Jack with Momo (Olivia Munn), her junior research analyst. Momo is opposed to Kate's lifestyle and is highly career-driven. Kate apologizes to Jack and later finds that she has lice. Throughout the meeting with Jack, Kate scratches her head profusely but manages to get through the meeting. Richard's mother, Marla (Jane Curtin) displays dismay with how both Kate and Richard are working and hopes that Kate will spend more time with the children.

Kate travels between Boston and New York City, juggling her personal life and her major project with Jack. Kate is impressed by Jack's character. Jack begins to show admiration for Kate. Jack reveals that he was married once to someone he loved who became sick and passed away. Jack sends Kate home by getting her a cab. Kate becomes more conscious in her contact with Jack. After a meeting in Boston, Momo reveals to Kate that she is pregnant. That night, Kate and Richard have a fight over the new babysitter.

After a meeting in Cleveland, Kate and Jack go to dinner. Jack brings Kate to a bowling alley. Kate reassures Allison that there is nothing romantic between them. Kate informs Momo that she will be taking five days off from work to spend time with her family in Atlanta. Momo reveals to Kate that she is planning to keep the baby. Later, Bunce teases Kate for taking time off from work. While in Atlanta, Kate decides to silence her phone and be fully present during the week. All is going well as Kate prepares Thanksgiving dinner for the family. Before Kate leaves, Ben finally speaks his first words, "Bye Bye, Mama".

Before the pitch, Momo experiences morning sickness. Despite her initial worries, Kate is reassured by Jack that the pitch went well. Jack informs Kate that he will be having lunch with the investor. The lunch goes well, but Jack later realizes he had many missed calls from Kate. The missed calls are from Richard, who could not get in touch with Kate. He calls to inform Kate that Ben has fallen down the stairs and hits his head. Kate rushes back to join them in the hospital, after which Kate and Richard have a fight. The next morning, Kate promises to build a snowman with the family. At work, Kate receives a phone call from Jack. He confesses his romantic feelings for her. Kate appreciates his feelings for her but states that she is very much in love with Richard and only wants to be with him.

Kate bids Jack farewell and rushes off to Emily's kindergarten. Kate and Richard walk to each other and Kate apologizes for prioritizing work over family. Richard tells her that he will be taking on more responsibility. The Momsters then appear, with Kate proudly exclaiming that she indeed brought store-bought pie to the bake sale. Months later, Momo gives birth to a baby boy.

Cast

Release
I Don't Know How She Does It was released for North American audiences on September 16, 2011.

Box office
I Don't Know How She Does It opened at #6 on its opening weekend with $4,402,201. It earned $9,662,284 in the United States as well as $20,889,211 internationally for a worldwide total of $30,551,495.

Reception
On Rotten Tomatoes, the film has an approval rating of 17% based on 112 reviews, with an average rating of 3.99/10. The site described the film as "[a] limp comedy with a hopelessly outdated viewpoint on gender, featuring Sarah Jessica Parker in rote Carrie-mode." On Metacritic, the film has a weighted average score of 38 out of 100, based on 31 critics, indicating "generally unfavorable reviews". Audiences polled by CinemaScore gave the film an average grade of "B−" on an A+ to F scale.

Sarah Jessica Parker earned a Razzie Award nomination as Worst Actress for her performance in the film (also for New Year's Eve), but "lost" to Adam Sandler for his performance in drag in Jack and Jill.

References

External links
 
 
 
 
 

2011 films
2011 comedy films
2010s English-language films
2010s feminist films
American feminist comedy films
Films about families
Films about parenting
Films based on British novels
Films directed by Douglas McGrath
Films scored by Aaron Zigman
Films set in Boston
Films set in Cleveland
Films set in New York City
Films shot in Boston
Films shot in New York City
Films with screenplays by Aline Brosh McKenna
The Weinstein Company films
2010s American films